Pectinaria may refer to:

Pectinaria (plant),  a genus of asclepiads (Apocynaceae)
Pectinaria (annelid), a genus of fanworms
Pectinaria Cordem., a synonym for the orchid genus Angraecum